The 2010 FIA GT1 Paul Ricard round was an auto racing event held at the Paul Ricard HTTT, Le Castellet, France on 2–4 June.  The Paul Ricard event was the fourth round of the 2010 FIA GT1 World Championship season.  The  circuit had previously been utilized by the FIA as a test circuit for all manufacturers as part of FIA GT1's balance of performance, and was also used by the FIA GT Championship in 2009.  Support series for the event include the FIA GT3 European Championship, the GT4 European Cup, and the Lamborghini Blancpain Super Trofeo.

Background

After three rounds of the championship, Romain Grosjean and Thomas Mutsch of Matech once again lead the Drivers Championship for the first time since their victory in Abu Dhabi to start the season.  Grosjean and Mutsch lead the Vitaphone pair of Michael Bartels and Andrea Bertolini by twelve points.  In the Teams Championship however it is Vitaphone who are on top but are carrying only a four-point margin over Matech.  Also, following a fire at Silverstone, Phoenix is once again down to a single Corvette, reducing the series grid to 23.  Defending GT1 class race winner Enrique Bernoldi, who won the 2009 FIA GT event in a Corvette, is also part of the 2010 field with Vitaphone Maserati.

Following the previous round in Brno, performance balancing modifications were published by the FIA which affected four manufacturers.  The affected four, Corvette, Maserati, Ford, and Aston Martin, all had weight added to their minimum requirement in order to retard their performance potential, with Maserati having the most dramatic change with  added to their minimum.  Further, the Fords also had their air restrictors reduced in size in order to decrease engine power.  In addition to performance balancing weight additions, four teams had success ballast further added following their performances at the Brno round.  Brno Championship Racing winners Romain Grosjean and Thomas Mutsch in the No. 5 Matech Ford will carry  of ballast for the second time this season, while the No. 7 Young Driver Aston Martin, No. 13 Phoenix Corvette, and No. 23 Sumo Power Nissan are also carrying with ballast.

Qualifying
Vitaphone Maserati drivers Michael Bartels and Andrea Bertolini earned their second consecutive pole position in FIA GT1 by setting a lap time over half a second faster than any other competitor in the third qualifying session.  Peter Kox and Christopher Haase gave Lamborghini their first front row start in FIA GT1 by taking second.

Qualifying result
For qualifying, Driver 1 participates in the first and third sessions while Driver 2 participates in only the second session.  The fastest lap for each session is indicated with bold.

Races

Qualifying race

Race result

Championship Race

Race result

References

External links
 Paul Ricard GT1 Race in France – FIA GT1 World Championship

Paul Ricard
FIA GT1